The 2019 Sky Blue FC season is the team's tenth season as a professional women's soccer team. Sky Blue FC plays in the National Women's Soccer League, the top tier of women's soccer in the United States.

Since the 2018 Sky Blue finished in last place and only won one game, 2019 offered opportunities for improvement. The off-season didn't get off to a promising start as two of the team's top draft picks, Hailie Mace (2nd overall pick) and Julia Ashley (6th overall pick) chose not to sign with the club. Mace signed with FC Rosengård and Ashley with Linköpings FC. Sky Blue's third and fourth picks, Paige Monaghan (10th overall pick) and Julie James (11th overall pick) did however choose to come to preseason and were ultimately signed.  During preseason training two Sky Blue players suffered season-ending injuries. Defender Mandy Freeman ruptured her Achilles tendon and midfielder Madison Tiernan tore her ACL and MCL.

On April 9, 2019 General Manager and President Tony Novo resigned from his position, Sky Blue Vice-President Alyse LaHue was appointed to take over as interim general manager. Kyra Carusa, Sky Blue's 19th overall pick in the 2019 Draft signed with Le Havre AC in France on April 25, making her the third Sky Blue draft pick to sign in Europe.

On June 28, Denise Reddy was fired as the team's head coach. Her record as head coach was 1-8-24. Goalkeeper coach Hugo Macedo filled in on a temporary basis until the club named Freya Coombe interim head coach on September 4.

Sky Blue played their first ever game at Red Bull Arena on August 18 against Reign FC. They set a club record with 9,415 in attendance for the game, which finished in a 1–1 draw. The positive feedback and high demand led the club to move their September 29 home finale to Red Bull Arena, where they drew 8,314 for a 1–1 draw against the Orlando Pride.

Team

First-team roster

As of July 19, 2019

Competitions

Preseason

Regular season

Regular-season standings

Results summary

Results by round

Statistical leaders

Top scorers

Top assists

Shutouts

Player transactions

2019 NWSL College Draft

 Source: National Women's Soccer League

In

Out

Awards

NWSL Team of the Month

NWSL Weekly Awards

NWSL Goal of the Week

NWSL Save of the Week

References

External links

See also
 2019 National Women's Soccer League season
 2019 in American soccer

Sky Blue FC
Sky Blue FC
NJ/NY Gotham FC seasons
Sky Blue FC